Mary Marsha Blackburn (née Wedgeworth; born June 6, 1952) is an American politician and businesswoman serving as the senior United States senator from Tennessee, a seat she has held since 2019. A member of the Republican Party, Blackburn was a state senator from 1999 to 2003 and represented  in the United States House of Representatives from 2003 to 2019, during which time the National Journal rated her among the House's most conservative members.

On November 6, 2018, she became the first woman to be elected to the U.S. Senate from Tennessee, defeating former Democratic Tennessee Governor Phil Bredesen. She took over as the state's senior senator in January 2021, when outgoing Senator Lamar Alexander retired. Blackburn, a supporter of the Tea Party movement, is a staunch backer of former president Donald Trump.

Early life and education
 
Marsha Wedgeworth was born in Laurel, Mississippi, to Mary Jo (Morgan) and Hilman Wedgeworth, who worked in sales and management. She placed fourth during a beauty pageant in high school.

Blackburn attended Mississippi State University on a 4-H scholarship, earning a Bachelor of Science in home economics in 1974. Blackburn was a member of the Chi Omega sorority, the Sigma Alpha Epsilon Little Sisters of Minerva (an auxiliary to a male fraternity) and was elected both as secretary and president of the Associated Women Students at Mississippi State University, wherein she worked to advance social issues through the AWS Zero Population Growth and the AWS venereal disease programs.

Early career and political activity
In 1973, before graduating, Blackburn worked as a sales manager for the Times Mirror Company. From 1975 to 1978, she worked in the Castner Knott Division of Mercantile Stores, Inc. In 1978, she became the owner of Marketing Strategies, a promotion-event management firm. She continues to run this business.

Blackburn was a founding member of the Williamson County Young Republicans. She was chair of the Williamson County Republican Party from 1989 to 1991. In 1992, she ran for Congress in Tennessee's 6th congressional district, losing to incumbent Bart Gordon, and was a delegate to the 1992 Republican National Convention. In 1995, Blackburn was appointed executive director of the Tennessee Film, Entertainment, and Music Commission by Tennessee governor Don Sundquist, holding that post through 1997.

Blackburn was a member of the Tennessee Senate from 1998 to 2003, and rose to be minority whip. In 2000, she took part in the effort to prevent the passage of a state income tax bill.

U.S. House of Representatives

Redistricting after the 2000 Census moved Blackburn's home from the 6th district into the 7th district, and created a gerrymandered district that stretched "in reptilian fashion" for 200 miles from eastern Memphis to southwest Nashville. In 2002, Blackburn ran in the Republican primary for this congressional seat. Of the four main candidates, she was the only one from the Nashville suburbs. The other three (Mark Norris, David Kustoff, and Brent Taylor) were all from Memphis or its suburbs. Blackburn was endorsed by the conservative Club for Growth. The three Memphians split the vote in that area, and she won the primary by nearly 20 percentage points.

In the general election, Blackburn defeated Democratic nominee Tim Barron with 70% of the vote. She was the fourth woman elected to Congress from Tennessee, and the first not to succeed a husband. She was reelected seven times with no substantial opposition, even running unopposed in 2004.

Redistricting after the 2010 census made the 7th district more compact; it lost its shares of Nashville and Memphis while picking up all of Clarksville. But it was no less Republican than its predecessor; with a Cook Partisan Voting Index of R+18, it is one of the South's most Republican districts.

Tenure 
In November 2007, Blackburn unsuccessfully ran for Republican conference chair. She was a senior advisor on Mitt Romney's 2008 presidential campaign, before resigning her position in the Romney campaign and endorsing Fred Thompson for president. Blackburn was an assistant whip in Congress from 2003 to 2005, as well as deputy whip from 2005.

Committee assignments

 Committee on the Budget
 Committee on Education and the Workforce
 Committee on Energy and Commerce
 Subcommittee on Commerce, Manufacturing and Trade, vice-chair
 Subcommittee on Communications and the Internet, chair
 Subcommittee on Health Care
 Subcommittee on Oversight and Investigations, vice-chair – Commerce, Manufacturing, and Trade
 Committee on Judiciary
 Committee on Oversight and Government Reform
Select Investigative Panel on Planned Parenthood, chair

U.S. Senate

2018 election 

In October 2017, Blackburn announced her candidacy for the Senate seat being vacated by Bob Corker. In her announcement, she said that House Republicans were frustrated with Senate Republicans, who they believed acted like Democrats on important issues, including Obamacare. In the announcement, Blackburn called herself a "hardcore, card-carrying Tennessee conservative", said she was "politically incorrect", and noted with pride that liberals had called her a "wingnut". She dismissed compromise and bipartisanship, saying "No compromise, no apologies." She also said that she carried a gun in her purse. On August 2, Blackburn received 610,302 votes (84.48%) in the Republican primary, winning the nomination.

Blackburn largely backed President Donald Trump's policies, including a U.S.–Mexico border wall, and shared his opinion of National Football League national anthem protests. Trump and Vice President Mike Pence endorsed her. During the campaign, Blackburn pledged to support Trump's agenda and suggested that Bredesen would not.

For most of the campaign, polls showed the two candidates nearly tied. But after Brett Kavanaugh's Supreme Court confirmation hearings, Blackburn pulled ahead. Some believe the hearings mobilized Republican voters in the state, even though Democrats won the House. Blackburn won the election with 54.7% of the vote to Bredesen's 43.9%, an unexpectedly large margin. She carried all but three counties in the state (Davidson, Shelby, and Haywood), the most counties ever won in an open Senate election in Tennessee.

Senate tenure

Blackburn was sworn in on January 3, 2019.

On March 22, 2022, during the confirmation hearings for Supreme Court nominee Ketanji Brown Jackson, Blackburn asked her to define the word "woman". Jackson responded, "I'm not a biologist."

Committee assignments
 Committee on Armed Services
 Subcommittee on Cybersecurity
 Subcommittee on Emerging Threats and Capabilities
 Subcommittee on Readiness and Management Support
 Committee on Commerce, Science, and Transportation
 Subcommittee on Communications, Media and Broadband
 Subcommittee on Consumer Protection, Product Safety and Data Protection (Ranking Member)
 Subcommittee on Oceans, Fisheries, Climate Change and Manufacturing
 Subcommittee on Tourism, Trade, and Export Promotion
 Committee on the Judiciary
 Subcommittee on Antitrust, Competition Policy and Consumer Rights
 Subcommittee on Immigration, Citizenship, and Border Safety
 Subcommittee on Intellectual Property
 Subcommittee on Privacy, Technology, and the Law
 Committee on Veterans' Affairs

Political positions 
Blackburn is a Tea Party Republican. She has been called staunchly conservative, and has sometimes attended functions of, and met with leaders of, far-right groups. She has called herself "a hard-core, card-carrying Tennessee conservative." She scored 100% on American Conservative Union's 2004, 2005, 2007, and 2009 ratings of Congress, and was estimated by GovTrack to be the most ideologically conservative member of the Senate for the 2019 legislative year.

Abortion and stem cell research
Blackburn opposes abortion and sought to overturn Roe v. Wade. In 2013, she was chosen to manage debate on a bill promoted by House Republicans that would have prohibited abortions after 22 weeks' gestation, with limited exceptions for rape or incest. She replaced the bill's prior sponsor, U.S. Representative Trent Franks, after Franks made controversial and dubious statements.

In 2015, Blackburn led a panel that investigated the Planned Parenthood undercover video controversy, in which anti-abortion activists published a video purporting to show that Planned Parenthood illicitly sold fetal tissue. Subsequent investigations into Planned Parenthood found no evidence of fetal tissue sales or of wrongdoing, but in 2017, when Blackburn announced that she was running for Senate, she ran a controversial advertisement saying that she "fought Planned Parenthood and we stopped the sale of baby body parts". In 2015, Blackburn claimed that 94% of Planned Parenthood's business revolves around abortion services, which FactCheck.org found to be "wrong".

In March 2016, Blackburn chaired the Republican-led Select Investigative Panel, a committee convened to "explore the ethical implications of using fetal tissue in biomedical research". Democrats on the panel characterized the probe as a politically motivated witch hunt.

Contraception and the right to privacy
In March 2022, Blackburn called Griswold v. Connecticut, a landmark Supreme Court decision holding that the Constitution protects the liberty of married couples to buy and use contraceptives without government restriction, "constitutionally unsound" as a ruling that "gave the court permission to bypass our system of checks and balances".

Birth certificate bill
In 2009, Blackburn sponsored legislation requiring presidential candidates to show their birth certificates. The bill was in response to conspiracy theories, commonly known as "birther" theories, that alleged that Barack Obama was not born in the United States. Her spokesperson said that Blackburn did not doubt that Obama was an American citizen.

Education
In 2017, Blackburn said she was in discussions with Ivanka Trump on ways to make child care more affordable. In 2021, when President Biden proposed universal pre-K for 3- and 4-year-olds and subsidized child care for low- and middle-income families, Blackburn likened the proposal to the communist policies of the Soviet Union. She also falsely claimed that the Biden administration proposed to put children in pre-K even if their families did not want to.

Health care and pharmaceuticals
Blackburn opposed the Affordable Care Act (Obamacare), saying upon its passage, "freedom dies a little bit today." She supported efforts to repeal the legislation. In 2017, while arguing for its repeal, Blackburn falsely stated that two of its popular provisions (protections for people with preexisting conditions and allowing adult children to be on their parents' health plans until they're 26) "were two Republican provisions which made it into the [Obamacare] bill." In her declaration that she would run for the Senate in 2018, she said that the failure to repeal the Affordable Care Act was "a disgrace".

At October 2013 congressional hearings on the Affordable Care Act, Blackburn said the healthcare.gov website violated HIPAA and health information privacy rights. The next day, when a CNN interviewer pointed out that the only health-related question the site asked was "do you smoke?" Blackburn repeated her criticism of the site for violating privacy rights.

According to The New York Times in 2017, Blackburn's best-known legislation was her co-sponsorship of a bill that revised the legal standard the Drug Enforcement Administration (DEA) had used to establish that "a significant and present risk of death or serious bodily harm that is more likely than not to occur", rather than the previous tougher standard of "imminent danger", before suspending the manufacturer's opioid drug shipments. The legislation passed the House and the Senate unanimously, but was criticized in internal Justice Department documents and by the DEA's chief administrative law judge as hampering DEA enforcement actions against drug distribution companies engaging in black-market sales. Joe Rannazzisi, who had led the Drug Enforcement Administration's Office of Diversion Control, said he informed Blackburn's staffers what the effects would be as a result of the passage of a 2016 law she co-sponsored. Blackburn said her bill had "unintended consequences", but Rannazzisi said they should have been anticipated. He said that during a July 2014 conference call he told congressional staffers the bill would cause more difficulties for the DEA if it pursued corporations that were illegally distributing such drugs. Blackburn and Representative Tom Marino, the main co-sponsor of her House bill, sent a letter requesting an Office of Inspector General investigation regarding Rannazzisi, saying he tried to intimidate Congress in the July conversation. Rannazzisi said he was removed from his DEA position in August 2015.

Climate change
Blackburn rejects the scientific consensus on climate change. In a 2014 debate with science communicator Bill Nye, Blackburn rejected the science and urgency of the issue, claiming that there is "no consensus" in the scientific community and that climate change remains "unproven".

Technology and telecommunications
Blackburn opposes net neutrality in the United States, calling it "socialistic". She opposes municipal broadband initiatives that aim to compete with Internet service providers. She supported bills that restrict municipalities from creating their own broadband networks, and wrote a bill to prevent the Federal Communications Commission (FCC) from preempting state laws that blocked municipal broadband.

In 2017, Blackburn introduced to the House a measure to dismantle an Obama-administration online privacy rule that the FCC adopted in October 2016. Her measure, which was supported by broadband providers but criticized by privacy advocates, repealed the rule that required broadband providers to obtain consumers' permission before sharing their online data, including browsing histories. The measure passed the House in a party-line vote in March 2017, after a similar measure had been passed the Senate the same week. She subsequently proposed legislation that expanded the requirement to include internet companies as well as broadband providers.

As of 2017, Blackburn had accepted at least $693,000 in campaign contributions from telecom companies.

Blackburn has advocated for increased regulation of technology companies and has criticized alleged anti-conservative bias on major platforms. In June 2018, she published an op-ed arguing for greater oversight and restrictions on technology companies that sparked a vocal backlash among employees at Google. During a 2020 Commerce Committee hearing in which she claimed that tech companies stifle free speech, Blackburn asked Google chief Sundar Pichai about the employment status of an employee who had criticized her.

LGBT rights

Blackburn opposes same-sex marriage and in 2004 and 2006 voted for proposed constitutional amendments to ban it. Of the Supreme Court's 2015 decision in Obergefell v. Hodges, Blackburn said, "Despite this decision, no one can overrule the truth about what marriage actually is—a sacred institution between a man and a woman." In 2010, she voted against repealing the military's Don't Ask, Don't Tell policy.

During her tenure as a representative, Blackburn sought to remove Kevin Jennings, a gay man who worked in the United States Department of Education, saying that Jennings "has played an integral role in promoting homosexuality and pushing a pro-homosexual agenda in America’s schools".

In 2013, Blackburn voted to reauthorize the Violence Against Women Act in the House, but voted against the Senate's version of the act, which expanded VAWA to apply to people regardless of sexual orientation. She argued that increasing the number of targets for VAWA funding would "dilute the money that needs to go into the sexual assault centers, domestic abuse centers, [and] child advocacy centers", and said VAWA ought to remain focused on supporting women's shelters and facilitating law enforcement against crimes against women, rather than addressing other groups or issues.

Blackburn voted against the Employment Non-Discrimination Act to ban discrimination against LGBT employees. In August 2019, she co-signed an amicus brief to the U.S. Supreme Court arguing that Title VII of the Civil Rights Act of 1964 does not prohibit employment discrimination based upon sexual orientation or gender identity. Blackburn has a 0% rating from the Human Rights Campaign, a gay rights group.

Donald Trump 
In November 2016, Blackburn joined Trump's presidential transition team as vice chair. She was a staunch supporter of his, and backed most of his policies and proposals. She nominated him for a Nobel Peace Prize for his negotiations with North Korea. Vox speculated that Blackburn's ties to Trump, who won Tennessee in the 2016 election by 26 points, helped boost her Senate candidacy.

During Trump's first Senate impeachment trial, Blackburn left the chamber for a television interview. She also garnered attention by reading a book during the proceedings. Blackburn spent time during the trial to tweet about Lt. Col. Vindman, calling him unpatriotic for allegedly "badmouth[ing] and ridicul[ing]" the United States in front of Russia. In November 2019, #MoscowMarcia started trending on Twitter after Blackburn tweeted allegations against Vindman on her Twitter account. The Week characterized her tweet as a "conspiratorial smear". In her post, she wrote "Vindictive Vindman is the 'whistleblower's' handler". The tweet was in reference to Vindman, a decorated army official and Purple Heart veteran, who became a central figure in Trump's impeachment proceedings in Congress after testifying he heard Trump pressure the president of Ukraine to investigate the son of one of his chief political rivals, former Vice President Joe Biden.

After Biden won the 2020 United States presidential election, Blackburn supported Trump's false claims of victory and raised funds to support the Trump campaign's effort to overturn the election results in court. In an interview on November 20, she briefly called Biden the "president-elect", but later retracted this as a mistake. On January 2, 2021, Blackburn and 10 other Republican senators announced that they would vote to oppose certification of the results of the election on January 6, the joint session of Congress in which the certification of a presidential election occurs, citing false allegations of widespread election fraud, irregularities, and unconstitutional changes to voting laws and voting restrictions. But after a mob of Trump supporters violently stormed Capitol Hill that day, she voted to certify the results of the election.

Immigration 
Blackburn supported Trump's 2017 executive order imposing a temporary travel and immigration ban barring citizens of seven Muslim-majority countries from entering the U.S. She has often expressed support of Trump's immigration policy, especially his plan to greatly expand the Mexico–United States barrier. In March 2021, Blackburn visited the southern border of the United States with several other Republican senators; she accused President Biden of encouraging a surge of illegal immigration.

Guns
After the 2018 Thousand Oaks shooting on November 7, 2018, which resulted in 12 deaths, Blackburn responded to a question about the shooting in a Fox News interview by saying, "how do we make certain that we protect the Second Amendment and protect our citizens? We've always done that in this country. Mental health issues need to be addressed."

Women's rights 
In 2009, Blackburn voted against the Lilly Ledbetter Fair Pay Act and the Paycheck Fairness Act.

SafeSport
In October 2021, Blackburn requested feedback from gymnast Aly Raisman and others on the structural failures of Olympic sport sexual abuse investigations, writing, "This was a systemic failure, and every single person in authority who turned a blind eye to your abuse must be held accountable". She sent the United States Center for SafeSport a letter demanding answers to questions posed during a Senate Judiciary Committee hearing on sex offender Larry Nassar.

China 

In December 2020, Blackburn posted, "China has a 5,000-year history of cheating and stealing. Some things will never change..." on her Twitter account. The European Union bureau chief for China's state-owned China Daily, Chen Weihua, responded by tweeting, "This is the most racist and ignorant US Senator I have seen. A lifetime bitch". In what appeared to be a thinly veiled reference to Chen, Blackburn asserted in her response that the U.S. would "not bow down to sexist communist thugs". One of Chen's tweets was, with an apparently sarcastic comment, retweeted by Republican Senator Marco Rubio. The Chinese American rights group Tennessee Chinese American Alliance protested Blackburn's comments as insulting to people of Chinese descent.

In August 2022, Blackburn led a congressional delegation to Taiwan, where she met with Taiwanese President Tsai Ing-wen. Her visit was the third such delegation to visit Taiwan following Speaker Nancy Pelosi's visit early that month. During her visit, Blackburn voiced support for Taiwan, calling it an "independent nation" and a "country", and also supported further U.S.-Taiwan relations and combating the "New Axis of Evil", which she defines as Iran, Russia, and North Korea, led by China. China claims Taiwan as part of its own territory and condemns most visits by U.S. lawmakers.

January 6 United States Capitol attack
In 2021, Blackburn abstained from voting on the creation of the January 6 commission.

Personal life
Blackburn is married to Chuck Blackburn. They live in Brentwood, a suburb of Nashville in Williamson County, and have two children. She is a Presbyterian.

Blackburn is a member of The C Street Family, a prayer group that includes members of Congress. She is a former member of the Smithsonian Libraries Advisory Board.

Blackburn is the author of The Mind of a Conservative Woman: Seeking the Best for Family and Country. The book was published on September 1, 2020, by Worthy Books.

Electoral history 

*Write-in and minor candidate notes: In 1992, write-ins received 10 votes.

*Write-in and minor candidate notes: In 2002, write-ins received 31 votes. In 2006, James B. "Mickey" White received 898 votes; William J. Smith received 848 votes; John L. Rimer received 710 votes, and Gayl G. Pratt received 663 votes.

See also
 Women in the United States House of Representatives
 Women in the United States Senate

References

External links

 Official U.S. Senate website
 Campaign website
 Podcast website
 
 
 

|-

|-

|-

|-

|-

1952 births
20th-century American politicians
20th-century American women politicians
20th-century Presbyterians
21st-century American politicians
21st-century American women politicians
21st-century Presbyterians
American anti-abortion activists
American Presbyterians
Christians from Mississippi
Female United States senators
Female members of the United States House of Representatives
Living people
Mississippi State University alumni
People from Brentwood, Tennessee
People from Laurel, Mississippi
Presbyterians from Tennessee
Republican Party members of the United States House of Representatives from Tennessee
Republican Party United States senators from Tennessee
Republican Party Tennessee state senators
Women state legislators in Tennessee
Conservatism in the United States
Beauty queen-politicians
American beauty pageant winners